WSON (860 AM) is a radio station in Henderson, Kentucky broadcasting a classic hits format.  The station is currently owned by Henson Media and features news, sports, weather and music features programming from NBC Radio News and Westwood One, as well as locally produced programming.  The station can be heard during daylight hours in neighboring Evansville, Indiana and Owensboro, Kentucky.

History 
WSON first signed on ten days after the attack on Pearl Harbor, and was owned by Henderson businessman Hecht Lackey.  For most of its first four decades on the air, WSON was a daytime-only station, signing off at sunset in order to protect CJBC in Toronto, Ontario, Canada.  However, a treaty between the United States and Canada signed in the mid-1980s allowed WSON and other daytimers that went off the air to protect Canadian clear-channel stations, to begin nighttime operations as well.  WSON must use a directional antenna from sunset to sunrise, with the signal oriented to the southwest; this protects the skywave signal of CJBC in Toronto, Ontario Canada.  860 AM is a Canadian clear-channel frequency.

Recent developments
In July 2010, owner Henry Lackey, the son of station founder Hecht Lackey, announced that he had agreed to sell WSON to Ed Henson, which owns WMSK-AM-FM in Morganfield and Sturgis, Kentucky.  The deal received FCC approval and was consummated soon thereafter.

In September 2011, WSON began simulcasting on an FM translator, W243CU (96.5 FM), which is licensed to Sebree, Kentucky.  W243CU, which has an effective radiated power of 250 watts, can be heard up to 30 miles in any direction from its transmitter site in the Wolf Hills north of Henderson.  It allows listeners in Evansville and surrounding communities to listen to WSON's programming after nightfall, when the AM station has to adjust its coverage.

References

External links
FCC History Cards for WSON
860 WSON on Twitter

SON
Radio stations established in 1941
Radio stations in Evansville, Indiana
Henderson, Kentucky
1941 establishments in Kentucky